Maaran may refer to:

Maaran (2002 film), an Indian Tamil film, starring Sathyaraj
Maaran (2022 film), an Indian Tamil film, starring Dhanush
Mani Maaran (born 1970), Tamil scholar

See also
Maran (disambiguation)